The under secretary of commerce for oceans and atmosphere, or USC(OA), is a high-ranking official in the United States Department of Commerce and the principal advisor to the United States secretary of commerce on the environmental and scientific activities of the department. The under secretary is dual hatted as the administrator of the National Oceanic and Atmospheric Administration within the Commerce Department.

The under secretary is appointed by the president of the United States with the consent of the United States Senate to serve at the pleasure of the president. The current under secretary is Rick Spinrad. He was nominated by Joe Biden on April 22, 2021, confirmed on June 17th and sworn in on June 22, 2021.

Overview
As the Administrator of the National Oceanic and Atmospheric Administration, the Under Secretary oversees the day-to-day functions of the National Oceanic and Atmospheric Administration, as well as laying out its strategic and operational future.

Components of the National Oceanic and Atmospheric Administration that the Administrator oversees include the National Environmental Satellite, Data and Information Service, National Marine Fisheries Service, National Ocean Service, National Weather Service, Oceanic and Atmospheric Research, Marine and Aviation Operations, and the NOAA Corps.

With the rank of Under Secretary, the USC(OA) is a Level III position within the Executive Schedule Since January 2010, the annual rate of pay for Level III is $165,300. The Under Secretary ranks fifth in the line of succession for the office of Secretary of Commerce.

History
The position of Under Secretary of Commerce for Oceans and Atmosphere was created by the National Oceanic and Atmospheric Administration Marine Fisheries Program Authorization Act of 1985. The position was created to serve as the Administrator of NOAA. It also created an Assistant Secretary of Commerce for Oceans and Atmosphere to serve as Deputy Administrator of NOAA. William Evans was the first person to have the title of Under Secretary of Commerce for Oceans and Atmosphere. The position of Administrator of the National Oceanic and Atmospheric Administration was created earlier by the Reorganization Plan No. 4 of 1970.

During the Donald Trump administration, the agency never had a confirmed leader. Trump first nominated former AccuWeather CEO Barry Myers to serve as Under Secretary of Commerce for Oceans and Atmosphere on Oct 12, 2017. His nomination was returned to President Trump by the Senate on January 3, 2018, resubmitted on January 8, 2018 returned again on January 3, 2019, and resubmitted again on January 16, 2019. In November 2019, Myers withdrew his nomination, citing health concerns. A month later, Trump nominated Neil Jacobs, then the acting administrator, to be the 11th administrator. Though Jacobs had Senate confirmation hearings in May 2020, he was never confirmed, in part because of the so-called Sharpiegate incident.

Reporting officials
Officials reporting to the USC(OA)/Administrator include:
Assistant Secretary of Commerce for Conservation and Management/Deputy Administrator
Assistant Secretary of Commerce for Environmental Observation and Prediction/Deputy Administration
NOAA Chief Scientist
Principal Deputy Under Secretary of Commerce for Oceans and Atmosphere
Deputy Under Secretary of Commerce for Operations
Assistant Administrator, National Marine Fisheries Service
Assistant Administrator, National Ocean Service
Assistant Administrator, National Environmental Satellite, Data and Information Service
Assistant Administrator, Oceanic and Atmospheric Research
Assistant Administrator, National Weather Service
Assistant Administrator, Program Planning and Integration

Officeholders
From 1970 to 1988, the head of NOAA was the NOAA Administrator. Starting with Bill Evans in 1988, that person held the title of Under Secretary of Commerce for Oceans and Atmosphere.

References

 
National Oceanic and Atmospheric Administration personnel